"Pretty Wings" is a single by American singer-songwriter Maxwell, taken from his fourth studio album BLACKsummers'night. It was written and produced by Maxwell and Hod David.

The song won the Grammy Award for Best Male R&B Vocal Performance and was nominated at the 52nd Grammy Awards for Song of the Year and Best R&B Song.

Background
Maxwell described "Pretty Wings" to MTV as "a bittersweet love song about meeting the right girl at the wrong time". The single is his first in seven years (previous single being the cover of Kate Bush's "This Woman's Work" in 2002). On further details of the song, Maxwell also told Billboard Magazine: "I met this girl who I still respect very much, and although it didn't work out, I got lots of inspiration from it. This track speaks of my time with her. " Glockenspiels are heard in the intro of the composition. Despite the drifty meditation music being audible while the horns, guitars, drums, cymbals, hi-hats, synthesized claps play, and Maxwell sings, the song contains a long, meditation music-like outro with horns blowing softly at the end.

The lyrics of the song express "pretty wings" as a metaphor; "If I can't have you, let love set you free to fly your pretty wings around."

Music video
The music video, directed by Philip Andelman, premiered on 106 & Park on April 28, 2009. To date, the video has been viewed on YouTube over 60 million times. The music video takes place in a dim household and some scenes of the video shows five separate women in their beds sleeping. Maxwell served as an Incubus who is in bed with the women in their own scenes. In the final minutes of the video the women all levitate above their beds after reaching a state of euphoria by the Incubus. The final shot is Maxwell leaving one of the bedrooms of one of the five women.  The music video was also ranked at #9 on BET's Notarized: Top 100 Videos of 2009 countdown.

Chart performance
"Pretty Wings" reached the top forty on the Billboard Hot 100. It also topped the Hot R&B/Hip-Hop Songs chart, making it Maxwell's first song in ten years to have done so (the last having been "Fortunate" in 1999). It remained at number one on that chart for fourteen consecutive weeks, which remains tied for the third-longest run at the top in the chart's history.

Weekly charts

Year-end charts

Certifications

References

External links
 "Pretty Wings" at Discogs

2009 singles
2009 songs
Music videos directed by Philip Andelman
Maxwell (musician) songs
Songs written by Maxwell (musician)
Columbia Records singles
Contemporary R&B ballads
2000s ballads